Christopher Philip Wyatt (born 10 June 1973) is a Welsh international rugby union player whose career as a lock forward lasted from 1998 to 2003, during which he attained 38 caps for the Wales national rugby union team.

Wyatt played club rugby in Wales for Newport RFC and Llanelli RFC before moving to Irish province Munster and French clubs Bourgoin and Aix-en-Provence.  His international debut came four days before his 25th birthday in the 6 June 1998 49–11 winning game against Zimbabwe at Harare.  He was selected for the Wales squad in the 1999 and 2003 Rugby World Cups and played his last game in the 2 November 2003 53–37 loss to New Zealand during World Cup match in Sydney.

References

External links 
Chris Wyatt career statistics {photograph included} at ''sporting-heroes.net/rugby-heroes
Munster Profile

Rugby union locks
Welsh rugby union players
Wales international rugby union players
Newport RFC players
Scarlets players
Munster Rugby players
Rugby union players from Newport, Wales
1973 births
Living people
Rugby sevens players at the 1998 Commonwealth Games